The Treaty of Berlin (formally the Treaty between Austria-Hungary, France, Germany, Great Britain and Ireland, Italy, Russia, and the Ottoman Empire for the Settlement of Affairs in the East) was signed on 13 July 1878. In the aftermath of the Russian victory against the Ottoman Empire in the Russo-Turkish War of 1877–1878, the major powers restructured the map of the Balkan region. They reversed some of the extreme gains claimed by Russia in the preliminary Treaty of San Stefano, but the Ottomans lost their major holdings in Europe. It was one of three major peace agreements in the period after the 1815 Congress of Vienna. It was the final act of the Congress of Berlin (13 June – 13 July 1878) and included Great Britain and Ireland, Austria-Hungary, France, Germany, Italy, Russia and the Ottoman Empire. Chancellor of Germany Otto von Bismarck was the chairman and dominant personality.

The most important task of the Congress was to decide the fate of Bulgaria, but Bulgaria itself was excluded from participation in the talks, at Russian insistence. At the time, as it was not a sovereign state, Bulgaria was not a subject of international law, and the same went for the Bulgarians themselves. The exclusion was already an established fact in the great powers' Constantinople Conference, which had been held one year before without any Bulgarian participation.

The most notable result of the conference was the official recognition of the newly independent states of Romania, Serbia and Montenegro (which had de facto been acting independently for decades).

Background
The Paris Peace Treaty of 1856, which ended the Crimean War, had made the Black Sea a neutral territory. The treaty had protected the Ottoman Empire, ended the Holy Alliance (Austria, Prussia and Russia) and weakened Russia's overall position. In 1870, Russia invoked the doctrine of rebus sic stantibus and effectively terminated the treaty by breaching provisions concerning the neutrality of the Black Sea. The great powers became increasingly convinced that the Ottoman Empire would not be able to hold its territories in Europe.

In 1875, the Herzegovina uprising resulted in the Great Eastern Crisis. As the conflict in the Balkans intensified, atrocities during the 1876 April Uprising in Bulgaria inflamed anti-Turkish sentiments in Russia and Britain, which eventually culminated in the Russo-Turkish War of 1877.

Terms 

The treaty formally recognized the independence of the de facto sovereign principalities of Romania, Serbia and Montenegro and the autonomy of Bulgaria although the latter de facto functioned independently and was divided into three parts: the Principality of Bulgaria, the autonomous province of Eastern Rumelia, and Macedonia, which was given back to the Ottomans, thus undoing Russian plans for an independent and Russophile "Greater Bulgaria". The Treaty of San Stefano had created a Bulgarian state, which was just what Britain and Austria-Hungary feared the most.

The Treaty of Berlin confirmed most of the Russian gains from the Ottoman Empire specified in the Treaty of San Stefano, but the valley of Alashkerd and the town of Bayazid were returned to the Ottomans. The  was a further continuation of negotiations. It reaffirmed the provisions of the Treaty of San Stefano which had not been modified by the Berlin Treaty and established amounts of compensation that the Ottoman Empire owed to Russia for losses to businesses and institutions during the war. It granted amnesty to Ottoman subjects and for release of prisoners of war. In addition, Article VII of the treaty provided that in the territory acquired by Russia, subjects could choose whether they wished to be Ottoman or Russian subjects for a period of six months after the agreement became effective.

Despite the pleas of the Romanian delegates, Romania was forced to cede southern Bessarabia to the Russian Empire. As a compensation, Romania received Dobruja, including the Danube Delta. The treaty also limited the Russian occupation of Bulgaria to 9 months, which limited the time during which Russian troops and supplies could be moved through Romanian territory.

The three newly independent states subsequently proclaimed themselves kingdoms: Romania in 1881, Serbia in 1882 and Montenegro in 1910, and Bulgaria proclaimed full independence in 1908 after it had united with Eastern Rumelia in 1885.  annexed Bosnia in 1908, sparking the Bosnian crisis, a major European crisis that reinforced  alliances.

The Treaty of Berlin accorded special legal status to some religious groups and also would serve as a model for the Minority Treaties, which would be established within the framework of the League of Nations. It stipulated that Romania recognize non-Christians (Jews and Muslims) as full citizens. It also vaguely called for a border rectification between Greece and the Ottoman Empire, which occurred after protracted negotiations in 1881, with the transfer of Thessaly to Greece.

In the "Salisbury Circular" of 1 April, British Foreign Secretary, the Marquess of Salisbury, made clear his own and his government's objections to the Treaty of San Stefano and its favourable position of Russia. Historian AJP Taylor wrote, "If the treaty of San Stefano had been maintained, both the Ottoman Empire and Austria-Hungary might have survived to the present day. The British, except for Beaconsfield in his wilder moments, had expected less and were, therefore, less disappointed. Salisbury wrote at the end of 1878: 'We shall set up a rickety sort of Turkish rule again south of the Balkans. But it is a mere respite. There is no vitality left in them. 
The treaty also calls on the parties involved to attack the nation that violates the treaty.'"

The Kosovo Vilayet remained part of the Ottoman Empire. Austria-Hungary was allowed to station military garrisons in the Ottoman Vilayet of Bosnia and the Sanjak of Novi Pazar. The Vilayet of Bosnia was placed under Austro-Hungarian occupation although it formally remained part of the Ottoman Empire until it was annexed by Austria-Hungary thirty years later, on 5 October 1908. The Austro-Hungarian garrisons in the Sanjak of Novi Pazar were withdrawn in 1908, after the annexation of the Vilayet of Bosnia and the resulting Bosnian Crisis, to reach a compromise with the Ottoman Empire, which was struggling with internal strife because of the Young Turk Revolution (1908). The chaotic situation in the Ottoman Empire also allowed Bulgaria to formally declare its independence on 5 October 1908.

List of plenipotentiaries 
 
 Benjamin Disraeli, Earl of Beaconsfield, Prime Minister
 Robert Gascoyne-Cecil, 3rd Marquess of Salisbury, Foreign Secretary
 Lord Odo Russell, ambassador to Berlin
  and Prussia
 Otto von Bismarck, Minister President of Prussia and Chancellor of Germany
 Baron Ernst von Bülow, Foreign Minister of Prussia
 Chlodwig, Prince of Hohenlohe-Schillingsfürst, ambassador to Paris
 
 Gyula, Count Andrássy, Foreign Minister
 Count Alajos Károlyi, ambassador to Berlin
 Baron Heinrich Karl von Haymerle, ambassador to Rome
 
 William Henry Waddington, the Comte de Saint-Vallier, ambassador to Berlin and Minister of Foreign Affairs
 Félix Hippolyte Desprez, Director of Political Affairs in the Department for Foreign Affairs
 
 Alexander, Prince Gorchakov, Chancellor and Foreign Minister
 Count Pyotr Shuvalov, ambassador to the court of St James's
 Paul d'Oubril, ambassador to Berlin
 
 Edoardo de Launay, ambassador to Berlin
 Luigi Corti
  Ottoman Empire
 Alexander Karatheodori Pasha, Minister of Public Works
 Mehmed Ali Pasha, marshal of the Ottoman army
 Sadullah Pasha, ambassador to Berlin

See also 
 Treaty of San Stefano
 Bulgarian irredentism
 Commissions of the Danube River
 Kosovo Vilayet
 List of treaties

References

Primary sources

Further reading 
 Anderson, M.S. The Eastern Question, 1774–1923: A Study in International Relations (1966) online 
 
 Langer, William L. European Alliances and Alignments: 1871-1890 (1950) pp 151–70. Online
 
 , Focus on the aftermath.
 
 
 Stavrianos, Leften Stavros. The Balkans since 1453 (1958).

External links

 

1878 in Austria-Hungary
1878 in Bulgaria
1878 in France
1878 in the Ottoman Empire
1878 treaties
Anti-Bulgarian sentiment
1870s in Romania
Territorial evolution of Romania
19th century in Serbia
19th century in Montenegro
Berlin, 1878
Berlin, 1878
Berlin, 1878
Berlin, 1878
Berlin, 1878
Berlin, 1878
Berlin, 1878
Berlin, 1878
1878 in the Russian Empire
History of Adjara
Ottoman period in Georgia (country)
July 1878 events